Herochroma urapteraria is a moth of the family Geometridae first described by Francis Walker in 1860. It is found in Sundaland. The habitat consists of lower and upper montane forests.

References

Moths described in 1860
Pseudoterpnini
Moths of Asia